Thomas Dean Willeford V (born October 29, 1964) is a steampunk writer, artist and maker. He is known for his work appearing on television and for his book Steampunk Gear, Gadgets, and Gizmos. He lives and works in Harrisburg, Pennsylvania, doing business as Brute Force Studios. His steampunk subculture persona is Lord Archibald "Feathers" Featherstone.

Early life and education 
Brought up in a Victorian house with a "mad scientist" grandfather who worked for DuPont, Willeford was educated at University of Maryland, College Park, Shenandoah University, University of Delaware and the University of Oxford.

Work 

In 1988, Willeford became interested in steampunk and began working on creating pieces combining his love of engineering and art. He created the steampunk arm worn by Nathan Fillion in episode 3.4 of the television series Castle. His work has been displayed at the University of Oxford's Museum of the History of Science, at the Steampunk Bizarre Experiment, the Penn State Berks Freyberger Gallery, at Nemo's Steampunk Art & Invention Gallery and at the Charles River Museum of Industry and Innovation, and has been featured in Popular Mechanics. He is a contributor to Bruce Boxleitner's Lantern City and was a judge on Game Show Network's Steampunk'd.

Willeford was a guest curator for the Steampunk U exhibit at the Antique Automobile Club of America Museum in Hershey, Pennsylvania.

Awards and recognition 
 Airship Awards 2013 – Community Contributor – Nominee
 Balticon 19 Masquerade – Best Marvel Comic Re-Creation (Nightcrawler)
 Balticon 20 Masquerade – Journeyman Costumer – Honorable Mention
 Balticon 29 Masquerade – Best in Class: Novice
 Balticon 48 Masquerade – Best in Show
 Comic Con International 2014: Costume Contest on the Marvel Stage – One of a Kind: Iron Man 1889
 Darkover VIII Masquerade – Best Presentation (X-Men)
 Eeriecon Masquerade 2002 – Master Class: Best Leatherwork ("Gargoyle Knight")
 EveCon 5 Masquerade – Most Dramatic
 NYClone 1986 Masquerade – Chairman's Appreciation: Re-Creation
 Philcon 50 Masquerade – Craftsman: Most Humorous
 Rovacon 10 Masquerade – Best Comic Book Character
 Starburner 2011 Award for Contributions to Steampunk
 Steampunk Chronicle Readers Choice Awards 2012:
 Best Maker – Individual
 Best Mod Weaponry for Lady Clankington's Little Death Ray
 Best Dressed Male
 Best Non-Goggle Accessory for Superior Replacement Arm
 Best Costume – Individual Original for the Clockwork Girl Outfit
 Best Non-Fiction – Nominee
 Steampunk Chronicle Readers Choice Awards 2013:
 Best Maker – Individual – Nominee
 Most Influential or Inspirational – Nominee
 Steam-Hunk – Nominee
 Steampunk Person to Watch in 2013 – Nominee
 Technicon IV Masquerade – Best In Show
 Unicon 84 Masquerade – Best Recreation
 Numerous International Costumers Guild (ICG) Awards

Bibliography

Filmography

Television

References

External links 
 
 Brute Force Studios

1964 births
Living people
People from Dauphin County, Pennsylvania
Writers from Harrisburg, Pennsylvania
University of Maryland, College Park alumni
Shenandoah University alumni
University of Delaware alumni
Alumni of the University of Oxford
Steampunk writers